The General Motors K platform (commonly called the K-body) was the basis of the Cadillac Seville model over two entirely different automobile platforms.
 1970s GM K platform (RWD)
 1980– GM K platform (FWD)

K